Sidney F. Barrett (1892–1958) of New York City, was a prominent stamp dealer who participated in various important philatelic ventures in New York City itself.

Philatelic literature
Because of his philatelic knowledge, he edited Scott's Specialized Catalogue of United States Stamps for a number of years.

Philatelic activity
Barrett served philately in a number of ways: as president of the American Stamp Dealers Association, director of the Association for Stamp Exhibitions, secretary-treasurer of the 1913 International Philatelic Exhibition, and as a member of the Board of Governors of the Collectors Club of New York.

Honors and awards
Barrett was named to the American Philatelic Society Hall of Fame in 1958.

See also
 Philatelic literature

References

External links
 Sidney F. Barrett American Philatelic Society Hall of Fame biography

1892 births
1958 deaths
Philatelic literature
American philatelists
American stamp dealers
Businesspeople from New York City
American Philatelic Society
20th-century American businesspeople